Molly Culver (born July 18, 1967 in Santa Clara County, California) is a retired American actress and model. She is best known for portraying the role of Tasha Dexter on the syndicated TV series, V.I.P..

Biography 
Culver has been a commentator on VH1's  I Love the '70s, I Love the '70s: Volume 2, I Love the '80s Strikes Back, I Love the '90s, I Love the '90s: Part Deux, I Love Toys, and I Love the New Millennium as well as the host of Dirt Rider Adventures on OLN. In 1999, she appeared along with Pamela Anderson & Natalie Raitano, her co-stars from V.I.P. on the MTV show Loveline. The co-stars from V.I.P. gave advice on love and romance along with Dr. Drew Pinsky, Adam Carolla & Diane Farr to phone-in callers and members of the live-studio audience.

She is in commercials for the Chase Sapphire credit card, as well as an Olive Garden commercial and an infomercial for 3 Minute Legs.

Molly Culver was the host of the HGTV show All American Handyman, which aired on September 5, 2010. She also had a role as Tia Canning in two episodes of the television series Criminal Minds''.

Filmography

References

External links
Official site
 
Molly Culver on web original 'Pushed' on TheWB

1967 births
Living people
American people of Chickasaw descent
American people of Choctaw descent
People from Santa Clara County, California
Actresses from California
20th-century American actresses
21st-century American actresses
People from Sonora, California